Nyctalus is a genus of vespertilionid bats commonly known as the noctule bats. They are distributed in the temperate and subtropical areas of Europe, Asia and North Africa.

There are eight species within this genus:

Birdlike noctule, Nyctalus aviator
Azores noctule, Nyctalus azoreum
Japanese noctule, Nyctalus furvus
Greater noctule bat, Nyctalus lasiopterus
Lesser noctule, Nyctalus leisleri
Mountain noctule, Nyctalus montanus
Common noctule, Nyctalus noctula
Chinese noctule, Nyctalus plancyi

See also
Microbat

References

 
Bat genera
Taxa named by Thomas Edward Bowdich